Voyager 2 is a space probe launched by NASA on August 20, 1977, to study the outer planets and interstellar space beyond the Sun's heliosphere. As a part of the Voyager program, it was launched 16 days before its twin, Voyager 1, on a trajectory that took longer to reach gas giants Jupiter and Saturn but enabled further encounters with ice giants Uranus and Neptune. Voyager 2 remains the only spacecraft to have visited either of the ice giant planets. Voyager 2 was the fourth of five spacecraft to achieve Solar escape velocity, which allowed it to leave the Solar System.

Voyager 2 successfully fulfilled its primary mission of visiting the Jovian system in 1979, the Saturnian system in 1981, Uranian system in 1986, and the Neptunian system in 1989. The spacecraft is now in its extended mission of studying interstellar space.

Voyager 2 has left the Sun's heliosphere and is traveling through the interstellar medium, a region of outer space beyond the influence of the Solar System, joining Voyager 1, which had reached the interstellar medium in 2012. Voyager 2 has begun to provide the first direct measurements of the density and temperature of the interstellar plasma.

Voyager 2 remains in contact with Earth through the NASA Deep Space Network. In 2020, maintenance to the Deep Space Network cut outbound contact with the probe for eight months. Contact was reestablished on November 2, 2020, when a series of instructions was transmitted, subsequently executed, and relayed back with a successful communication message. On February 12, 2021, full communications with the probe were restored after a major antenna upgrade that took a year to complete. The DSS 43 communication antenna, which is solely responsible for communications with the probe, is located near Canberra, Australia.

History

Background
In the early space age, it was realized that a periodic alignment of the outer planets would occur in the late 1970s and enable a single probe to visit Jupiter, Saturn, Uranus, and Neptune by taking advantage of the then-new technique of gravity assists. NASA began work on a Grand Tour, which evolved into a massive project involving two groups of two probes each, with one group visiting Jupiter, Saturn, and Pluto and the other Jupiter, Uranus, and Neptune. The spacecraft would be designed with redundant systems to ensure survival through the entire tour. By 1972 the mission was scaled back and replaced with two Mariner program-derived spacecraft, the Mariner Jupiter-Saturn probes. To keep apparent lifetime program costs low, the mission would include only flybys of Jupiter and Saturn, but keep the Grand Tour option open. As the program progressed, the name was changed to Voyager.

The primary mission of Voyager 1 was to explore Jupiter, Saturn, and Saturn's moon, Titan. Voyager 2 was also to explore Jupiter and Saturn, but on a trajectory that would have the option of continuing on to Uranus and Neptune, or being redirected to Titan as a backup for Voyager 1. Upon successful completion of Voyager 1's objectives, Voyager 2 would get a mission extension to send the probe on towards Uranus and Neptune.

Spacecraft design
Constructed by the Jet Propulsion Laboratory (JPL), Voyager 2 included 16 hydrazine thrusters, three-axis stabilization, gyroscopes and celestial referencing instruments (Sun sensor/Canopus Star Tracker) to maintain pointing of the high-gain antenna toward Earth. Collectively these instruments are part of the Attitude and Articulation Control Subsystem (AACS) along with redundant units of most instruments and 8 backup thrusters. The spacecraft also included 11 scientific instruments to study celestial objects as it traveled through space.

Communications
Built with the intent for eventual interstellar travel, Voyager 2 included a large,  parabolic, high-gain antenna (see diagram) to transceive data via the Deep Space Network on the Earth. Communications are conducted over the S-band (about 13 cm wavelength) and X-band (about 3.6 cm wavelength) providing data rates as high as 115.2 kilobits per second at the distance of Jupiter, and then ever-decreasing as distance increases, because of the inverse-square law. When the spacecraft is unable to communicate with Earth, the Digital Tape Recorder (DTR) can record about 64 megabytes of data for transmission at another time.

Power
Voyager 2 is equipped with three Multihundred-Watt radioisotope thermoelectric generators (MHW RTG). Each RTG includes 24 pressed plutonium oxide spheres, and provided enough heat to generate approximately 157 W of electrical power at launch. Collectively, the RTGs supplied the spacecraft with 470 watts at launch (halving every 87.7 years). They were predicted to allow operations to continue until at least 2020 and have already done so.

Attitude control and propulsion
Because of the energy required to achieve a Jupiter trajectory boost with an  payload, the spacecraft included a propulsion module made of a  solid-rocket motor and eight hydrazine monopropellant rocket engines, four providing pitch and yaw attitude control, and four for roll control. The propulsion module was jettisoned shortly after the successful Jupiter burn.

Sixteen hydrazine MR-103 thrusters on the mission module provide attitude control. Four are used to execute trajectory correction maneuvers; the others in two redundant six-thruster branches, to stabilize the spacecraft on its three axes. Only one branch of attitude control thrusters is needed at any time.

Thrusters are supplied by a single  diameter spherical titanium tank. It contained  of hydrazine at launch, providing enough fuel until 2034.

Scientific instruments

For more details on the Voyager space probes' identical instrument packages, see the separate article on the overall Voyager Program.

Mission profile

Launch and trajectory
The Voyager 2 probe was launched on August 20, 1977, by NASA from Space Launch Complex 41 at Cape Canaveral, Florida, aboard a Titan IIIE/Centaur launch vehicle. Two weeks later, the twin Voyager 1 probe was launched on September 5, 1977. However, Voyager 1 reached both Jupiter and Saturn sooner, as Voyager 2 had been launched into a longer, more circular trajectory.

In April 1978, a complication arose when no commands were transmitted to Voyager 2 for a period of time, causing the spacecraft to switch from its primary radio receiver to its backup receiver. Sometime afterwards, the primary receiver failed altogether. The backup receiver was functional, but a failed capacitor in the receiver meant that it could only receive transmissions that were sent at a precise frequency, and this frequency would be affected by the Earth's rotation (due to the Doppler effect) and the onboard receiver's temperature, among other things. For each subsequent transmission to Voyager 2, it was necessary for engineers to calculate the specific frequency for the signal so that it could be received by the spacecraft.

Encounter with Jupiter

Voyager 2s closest approach to Jupiter occurred at 22:29 UT on July 9, 1979. It came within  of the planet's cloud tops.
Jupiter's Great Red Spot was revealed as a complex storm moving in a counterclockwise direction. Other smaller storms and eddies were found throughout the banded clouds.

Voyager 2 returned images of Jupiter, as well as its moons Amalthea, Io, Callisto, Ganymede, and Europa. During a 10-hour "volcano watch", it confirmed Voyager 1s observations of active volcanism on the moon Io, and revealed how the moon's surface had changed in the four months since the previous visit. Together, the Voyagers observed the eruption of nine volcanoes on Io, and there is evidence that other eruptions occurred between the two Voyager fly-bys.

Jupiter's moon Europa displayed a large number of intersecting linear features in the low-resolution photos from Voyager 1. At first, scientists believed the features might be deep cracks, caused by crustal rifting or tectonic processes. Closer high-resolution photos from Voyager 2, however, were puzzling: the features lacked topographic relief, and one scientist said they "might have been painted on with a felt marker". Europa is internally active due to tidal heating at a level about one-tenth that of Io.

Two new, small satellites, Adrastea and Metis, were found orbiting just outside the ring. A third new satellite, Thebe, was discovered between the orbits of Amalthea and Io.

Encounter with Saturn

The closest approach to Saturn occurred at 03:24:05 UT on August 26, 1981.

While passing behind Saturn (as viewed from Earth), Voyager 2 probed Saturn's upper atmosphere with its radio link to gather information on atmospheric temperature and density profiles. The north pole was found to be  cooler, although this may be seasonal (see also Saturn Oppositions).

After the fly-by of Saturn, the camera platform of Voyager 2 locked up briefly, putting plans to officially extend the mission to Uranus and Neptune in jeopardy. The mission's engineers were able to fix the problem (caused by an overuse that temporarily depleted its lubricant), and the Voyager 2 probe was given the go-ahead to explore the Uranian system.

Encounter with Uranus

The closest approach to Uranus occurred on January 24, 1986, when Voyager 2 came within  of the planet's cloudtops. Voyager 2 also discovered 11 previously unknown moons: Cordelia, Ophelia, Bianca, Cressida, Desdemona, Juliet, Portia, Rosalind, Belinda, Puck and Perdita. The mission also studied the planet's unique atmosphere, caused by its axial tilt of 97.8°; and examined the Uranian ring system. The length of a day on Uranus as measured by Voyager 2 is 17 hours, 14 minutes. Uranus was shown to have a magnetic field that was misaligned with its rotational axis, unlike other planets that had been visited to that point, and a helix-shaped magnetic tail stretching 10 million kilometers (6 million miles) away from the Sun.

When Voyager 2 visited Uranus, much of its cloud features were hidden by a layer of haze; however, false-color and contrast-enhanced images show bands of concentric clouds around its south pole. This area was also found to radiate large amounts of ultraviolet light, a phenomenon that is called "dayglow". Surprisingly, the illuminated and dark poles, and most of the planet, exhibit nearly the same temperatures at the cloud tops.

Detailed images from Voyager 2s flyby of the Uranian moon Miranda showed huge canyons made from geological faults. One hypothesis suggests that Miranda might consist of a reaggregation of material following an earlier event when Miranda was shattered into pieces by a violent impact.

Voyager 2 discovered two previously unknown Uranian rings. Measurements showed that the Uranian rings are distinctly different from those at Jupiter and Saturn. The Uranian ring system might be relatively young, and it did not form at the same time that Uranus did. The particles that make up the rings might be the remnants of a moon that was broken up by either a high-velocity impact or torn up by tidal effects.

In March 2020, NASA astronomers reported the detection of a large atmospheric magnetic bubble, also known as a plasmoid, released into outer space from the planet Uranus, after reevaluating old data recorded during the flyby.

Encounter with Neptune

Following a mid-course correction in 1987, Voyager 2s closest approach to Neptune occurred on August 25, 1989. Through repeated computerized test simulations of trajectories through the Neptunian system conducted in advance, flight controllers determined the best way to route Voyager 2 through the Neptune-Triton system.

Voyager 2 discovered previously unknown Neptunian rings, and confirmed six new moons: Despina, Galatea, Larissa, Proteus, Naiad and Thalassa. While in the neighborhood of Neptune, Voyager 2 discovered the "Great Dark Spot", which has since disappeared, according to observations by the Hubble Space Telescope. The Great Dark Spot was later hypothesized to be a region of clear gas, forming a window in the planet's high-altitude methane cloud deck.

With the decision of the International Astronomical Union to reclassify Pluto as a dwarf planet in 2006, the flyby of Neptune by Voyager 2 in 1989 retroactively became the point when every known planet in the Solar System had been visited at least once by a space probe.

Interstellar mission

Once its planetary mission was over, Voyager 2 was described as working on an interstellar mission, which NASA is using to find out what the Solar System is like beyond the heliosphere. Voyager 2 is currently  transmitting scientific data at about 160 bits per second. Information about continuing telemetry exchanges with Voyager 2 is available from Voyager Weekly Reports.

In 1992, Voyager 2 observed the nova V1974 Cygni in the far-ultraviolet.

In July 1994, an attempt was made to observe the impacts from fragments of the comet Comet Shoemaker–Levy 9 with Jupiter. The craft's position meant it had a direct line of sight to the impacts and observations were made in the ultraviolet and radio spectrum. Voyager 2 failed to detect anything, with calculations showing that the fireballs were just below the craft's limit of detection.

On November 29, 2006, a telemetered command to Voyager 2 was incorrectly decoded by its on-board computer—in a random error—as a command to turn on the electrical heaters of the spacecraft's magnetometer. These heaters remained turned on until December 4, 2006, and during that time, there was a resulting high temperature above , significantly higher than the magnetometers were designed to endure, and a sensor rotated away from the correct orientation.  As of this date it had not been possible to fully diagnose and correct for the damage caused to Voyager 2s magnetometer, although efforts to do so were proceeding.

On August 30, 2007, Voyager 2 passed the termination shock and then entered into the heliosheath, approximately  closer to the Sun than Voyager 1 did. This is due to the interstellar magnetic field of deep space. The southern hemisphere of the Solar System's heliosphere is being pushed in.

On April 22, 2010, Voyager 2 encountered scientific data format problems. On May 17, 2010, JPL engineers revealed that a flipped bit in an on-board computer had caused the problem, and scheduled a bit reset for May 19. On May 23, 2010, Voyager 2 resumed sending science data from deep space after engineers fixed the flipped bit. Currently research is being done regarding marking the area of memory with the flipped bit off limits or disallowing its use. The Low-Energy Charged Particle Instrument is currently operational, and data from this instrument concerning charged particles is being transmitted to Earth. This data permits measurements of the heliosheath and termination shock. There has also been a modification to the on-board flight software to delay turning off the AP Branch 2 backup heater for one year. It was scheduled to go off February 2, 2011 (DOY 033, 2011–033).

It is more than twice as far from the Sun as Pluto, and far beyond the perihelion of 90377 Sedna, but not yet beyond the outer limits of the orbit of the dwarf planet Eris.

Sunlight takes 13.73 hours to get to Voyager 2. The brightness of the Sun from the spacecraft is magnitude −16.7. Voyager 2 is heading in the direction of the constellation Telescopium. To compare, Proxima Centauri, the closest star to the Sun, is about 4.2 light-years (or ) distant. At this velocity, 81,438 years would pass before Voyager 2 reaches the nearest star, Proxima Centauri, were the spacecraft traveling in the direction of that star. Voyager 2 will need about 19,390 years at its current velocity to travel a complete light year.

On November 7, 2012, Voyager 2 reached  from the Sun, making it the third human-made object to reach that distance and the second that was still sending data to Earth at that distance. While Pioneer has ceased communications, both the Voyager spacecraft are performing well and are still communicating.

There is a variation in distance from Earth caused by the Earth's revolution around the Sun relative to Voyager 2.

It was originally thought that Voyager 2 would enter interstellar space in early 2016, with its plasma spectrometer providing the first direct measurements of the density and temperature of the interstellar plasma. In December 2018, the Voyager project scientist, Edward C. Stone, announced that Voyager 2 reached interstellar space on November 5, 2018.

In October 2020, astronomers reported a significant unexpected increase in density in the space beyond the Solar System as detected by the Voyager 1 and Voyager 2 space probes. According to the researchers, this implies that "the density gradient is a large-scale feature of the VLISM (very local interstellar medium) in the general direction of the heliospheric nose".

Reductions in capabilities
As the power from the RTG slowly reduces, various items of equipment have been turned off on the spacecraft. The first science equipment turned off on Voyager 2 was the PPS in 1991, which saved 1.2 watts.

Future of the probe
In 2023, Voyager 2 is expected to pass Pioneer 10 to become the second furthest spacecraft from the Sun at a distance of around 12.4 billion miles.

The probe is expected to keep transmitting weak radio messages until at least the mid-2020s, more than 48 years after it was launched.

Distant future
Voyager 2 is not headed toward any particular star, although in roughly 42,000 years, it will have a close approach with the star Ross 248 at a distance of a few light-years. If undisturbed for 296,000 years, Voyager 2 should pass by the star Sirius at a distance of 4.3 light-years.

Golden record

Both Voyager space probes carry a gold-plated audio-visual disc in the event that either spacecraft is ever found by intelligent life-forms from other planetary systems. The discs carry photos of the Earth and its lifeforms, a range of scientific information, spoken greetings from the people (e.g. the Secretary-General of the United Nations and the President of the United States, and the children of the Planet Earth) and a medley, "Sounds of Earth", that includes the sounds of whales, a baby crying, waves breaking on a shore, and a collection of music, including works by Wolfgang Amadeus Mozart, Blind Willie Johnson, Chuck Berry's "Johnny B. Goode", Valya Balkanska and other Eastern and Western classics and ethnic performers. (see also Music in space)

See also
 Family Portrait
 The Farthest, a 2017 documentary on the Voyager program.
 List of artificial objects leaving the Solar System
 List of missions to the outer planets
 New Horizons
 Pioneer 10
 Pioneer 11
 Timeline of artificial satellites and space probes
 Voyager 1

Notes

References

Further reading
 
 
 Nardo, Don (2002). Neptune. Thomson Gale. 
 JPL Voyager Telecom Manual

External links

 NASA Voyager website
 Voyager 2 Mission Profile by NASA's Solar System Exploration
 Voyager 2 (NSSDC Master Catalog)

1977 in spaceflight
1977 in the United States
1977 robots
August 1977 events in the United States
Individual space vehicles
Missions to Jupiter
Missions to Neptune
Missions to Saturn
Missions to Uranus
NASA space probes
Nuclear-powered robots
Radio frequency propagation
Spacecraft escaping the Solar System
Spacecraft launched by Titan rockets
Spacecraft launched in 1977